The J. Robert Donnelly Husky Heritage Sports Museum is a public museum located on the University of Connecticut's main campus at Storrs, Connecticut. The museum documents and celebrates UConn's intercollegiate athletics. Opening its doors on January 19, 2002, the 2,700-square-foot museum was named in honor of benefactor and 1940 Connecticut basketball and football captain J. Robert (Bob) Donnelly (1971-2005). Exhibits include national and regional championship trophies, trading cards, photographs, and various sports memorabilia, as well as a six-screen video wall replaying moments of triumph for the UConn Huskies. A life-size fiberglass sculpture of Jonathan the Husky, UConn's mascot, greets visitors at the museum entrance. The Connecticut Basketball Rotunda, featuring NCAA championship trophies and life-size cutouts of Ray Allen and Rebecca Lobo, is among the museum's permanent exhibits.

References

External links 
 
 UConn Athletics official website

Sports museums in Connecticut
Mansfield, Connecticut
University of Connecticut
Museums in Tolland County, Connecticut
University museums in Connecticut